Eolotagnostus is a genus of trilobite in the order Agnostida, which existed in what is now Gansu, China. It was described by Zhou in 1982, and the type species is Eolotagnostus gansuensis.

References

Agnostidae
Fossils of China